The list of Airfields of the United States Army Air Forces First Air Force is as follows:

Tactical Airfields
 Charleston Army Air Base
 Dover Air Force Base
 Fort Dix Army Air Base
 Godman Army Airfield
 Mitchel Field
 Norfolk International Airport
 Richmond International Airport
 Scholes International Airport at Galveston
 Suffolk County Army Air Field
 Westover Field
 Wilmington International Airport

Group Training Stations
 Baltimore Municipal Airport
 Charleston Army Air Base
 Columbia Army Air Base
 Dover Air Force Base
 Fort Dix Army Air Base
 Godman Army Airfield
 Groton–New London Airport
 Harris Neck Army Air Field
 Millville Army Airfield
 Mitchel Field
 Oscoda Army Air Field
 Reading Regional Airport
 Richmond International Airport
 Selfridge Air National Guard Base
 Westover Field

Replacement Training Stations
 Aiken Army Air Field
 Charleston Army Air Base
 Columbia Army Air Base
 Dover Air Force Base
 Florence Regional Airport
 Fort Dix Army Air Base
 Godman Army Airfield
 Greenville Army Air Base
 Lowcountry Regional Airport
 Millville Army Airfield
 Mitchel Field
 Oscoda Army Air Field
 Selfridge Air National Guard Base
 Shaw Air Force Base
 Westover Field

Sources
R. Frank Futrell, “The Development of Base Facilities,” in The Army Air Forces in World War II, vol. 6, Men and Planes, ed. Wesley Frank Craven and James Lea Cate, 142 (Washington, D.C., Office of Air Force History, new imprint, 1983).

Airfields of the United States Army Air Forces in the United States
Lists of United States military installations
United States Army Air Forces lists
Lists of airports in the United States